Savant Lake (Sturgeon Lake) Water Aerodrome  is located  southeast of Savant Lake, Thunder Bay District, Ontario, Canada.

The gravel strip is visible from the air and is still listed on the visual flight rules (VFR) aeronautical charts.

References

Registered aerodromes in Ontario
Transport in Thunder Bay District
Seaplane bases in Ontario